Vâltori may refer to several places in Romania:

 Vâltori, a village in the town of Zlatna, Alba County
 Vâltori, a village in Vadu Moţilor Commune, Alba County
 Vâltori (river), tributary of the Ampoi in Alba County